The fourth USS Tigress was a United States Navy patrol vessel in commission from 1917 to 1918 or 1919.

Tigress was built in 1905 as a private yawl of the same name by W. A. Robinson at Bridgeport, Connecticut. On 26 June 1917, the U.S. Navy inspected her in the 7th Naval District for possible naval use and chartered her from her owner that year for use as a section patrol boat during World War I. She never received a section patrol (SP) number, but was commissioned on 18 August 1917 as USS Tigress.

Assigned to the 7th Naval District and manned by naval reservists, Tigress served on section patrol duties in the Tampa, Florida, area for the rest of World War I. The Navy returned her to her owner soon after the end of the war.

Notes

References

NavSource Online: Section Patrol Craft Photo Archive Tigress

Yawls of the United States Navy
Patrol vessels of the United States Navy
World War I patrol vessels of the United States
Ships built in Bridgeport, Connecticut
1905 ships